This article shows all participating team squads at the 2012 FIVB Women's Club World Championship squads, held from October 13 to 19, 2012 in Doha, Qatar.

Pool A

Rabita Baku
Head Coach:  Zoran Gajic

Sollys Nestlé Osasco
Head Coach:  Luizomar de Moura

Bohai Bank Tianjin
Head Coach:  Wang Baoquan

Pool B

Fenerbahçe
Head Coach:  Kamil Soz

Lancheras de Cataño
Head Coach:  Rafael Olazagasti

Kenya Prisons
Head Coach:  David Lung'aho

References 

C
2012 in volleyball